Stephen Gallagher (born 9 July 1980 in Armagh, Northern Ireland) is an Irish professional cyclist and cycling coach, who last rode for the British continental cycling team . He previously rode for the  team.

He moved to France to pursue his cycling career at the age of 17, riding as an amateur for four years, before turning professional in 2003. Gallagher took his biggest win when he won the general classification of the 2008 FBD Insurance Rás.

He missed most of the 2009 season due to a family illness.

Gallagher established the coaching firm Dig Deep Coaching in 2011. He was technical director of the Northern Irish team for the Gran Partenza of the 2014 Giro d'Italia.

Major results

2000
9th, Irish National Road Race Championship

2004 – Flanders Cycling team
3rd, Irish National Time Trial Championship

2005 – Flanders Cycling team
4th, Irish National Time Trial Championship
23rd, CSC Classic
39th, Scheldeprijs Vlaanderen

2006 – Giant Asia Racing Team
1st overall, Tour de Taiwan
3rd overall, Tour of Thailand
3rd, Stage 3,
4th, Stage 1,
45th overall, Tour of Indonesia (2.2)
2nd, Stage 5
13th, Stage 1

2007 – 
6th overall, FBD Insurance Rás (2.2)
5th, Stage 6
6th, Stage 4
7th, Stage 5

2008 – 
1st overall, FBD Insurance Rás (2.2)
3rd, Stage 2
3rd, Stage 6
7th, Stage 1
9th, Stage 4
7th, Stage 1, XLII Cinturón Ciclista a Mallorca (2.2)
11th overall, Ronde de l'Oise (2.2)
8th, Stage 4
9th, Stage 5
29th overall, Volta Ciclista da Ascension (2.2)
62nd overall, Tour of Britain (2.1)
130th overall, Tour of Algarve (2.1)

2009 – 
53rd overall, Tour of Algarve (2.1)
47th, Stage 3
73rd, Stage 5
93rd, Stage 2

2010 – 
1st, Wallace Caldwell Memorial Road Race
2nd overall, Suir Valley 3 day
1st, Stage 4
4th, Stage 3 (ITT)
4th, Stage 2
10th, Stage 1
2nd, Ben McKenna Memorial Road Race
6th, East Midlands International Cicle Classic (1.2)
26th overall, FBD Insurance Ras (2.2)
9th, Stage 4
53rd overall, Tour of Britain (2.1)
23rd, Stage 2

2011
5th Ryedale Grand Prix

References

External links
Profile on team website

Irish male cyclists
1980 births
Living people
People from Armagh (city)
Cycling coaches
Rás Tailteann winners